Sub-caliber ammunition is firearm ammunition where the projectile has a smaller diameter than the bore of the gun barrel from which it is fired. Firing sub-caliber ammunition has several potential benefits compared to full-caliber ammunition. It can for example allow for much higher muzzle velocities due to smaller lighter projectiles being fired from relatively larger propellant charges, but it can also lower the cost of ammunition due to less material being used to produce the round compared to a full-caliber ammunition etc.

Several methods exists to be able to fire sub-caliber ammunition.

Sabot method 

The most traditional way to fire sub-caliber ammunition is to fit the projectile with an expendable sabot. The sabot is a device which fills out the missing caliber when the projectile is fired and then leaves the projectile once it has left the barrel.

Saboted sub-caliber ammunition types 
Flechette
Armour-piercing discarding sabot (APDS)
Armour-piercing fin-stabilized discarding sabot (APFSDS)
Saboted light armor penetrator (SLAP)
Flechette (not necessarily a sub-caliber projectile)
Shotgun shell (the wad is considered a sabot in some countries)

Flange method 

A common method during World War Two, often called the Gerlich-, Littlejohn- or tapered bore principle, was to fit sub-caliber ammunition with soft metal flanges filling out the missing caliber and then fire them from squeeze bore barrels. Squeeze bore barrels, often found on shotguns (see Choke (firearms)), progressively decreases its bore diameter towards the muzzle, resulting in a reduced final bore. When fired the flanges on the projectile would fold inwards as it travels through the reducing inner diameter of the squeeze bore.

Flanged sub-caliber ammunition types 
Armor-piercing composite non-rigid (APCNR)
Armor-piercing non-rigid (APNR)

Sub-caliber barrel 
A third method is to simply fit a smaller barrel into the original full caliber weapon which then allows the firing of smaller caliber cartridges. This is called sub-caliber training and it is used to lower the cost of training with large caliber weapons by allowing them to fire cheaper lower caliber ammunition and to not put wear on the original barrel.

References

Notes 

Ammunition